There are at least 56 members of the evening-primrose and loosestrife order, Myrtales, found in Montana. Some of these species are exotics (not native to Montana) and some species have been designated as Species of Concern.

Evening-primrose

Family: Onagraceae

Calylophus serrulatus, yellow evening primrose
Camissonia andina, obscure evening-primrose
Camissonia breviflora, short-flower evening-primrose
Camissonia minor, small-flowered evening-primrose
Camissonia parvula, small camissonia
Camissonia scapoidea, naked-stemmed evening-primrose
Camissonia subacaulis, long-leaf evening-primrose
Camissonia tanacetifolia, tansy-leaf evening-primrose
Circaea alpina, small enchanter's-nightshade
Circaea alpina subsp. alpina, small enchanter's-nightshade
Circaea alpina subsp. pacifica, small enchanter's-nightshade
Clarkia pulchella, large-flower clarkia
Clarkia rhomboidea, diamond clarkia
Epilobium anagallidifolium, alpine willowherb
Epilobium angustifolium, fireweed
Epilobium brachycarpum, panicled willowherb
Epilobium ciliatum, hairy willowherb
Epilobium ciliatum subsp. ciliatum, fringed willowherb
Epilobium ciliatum subsp. glandulosum, fringed willowherb
Epilobium clavatum, clavate-fruit willowherb
Epilobium densiflorum, dense spike-primrose
Epilobium foliosum, california willowherb
Epilobium glaberrimum, glaucous willowherb
Epilobium halleanum, glandular willowherb
Epilobium hornemannii, hornemann's willowherb
Epilobium lactiflorum, white-flower willowherb
Epilobium latifolium, dwarf fireweed
Epilobium leptocarpum, slender-fruited willowherb
Epilobium minutum, small-flower willowherb
Epilobium oregonense, oregon willow-herb
Epilobium palustre, marsh willowherb
Epilobium palustre var. gracile, linear-leaved willowherb
Epilobium palustre var. palustre, marsh willowherb
Epilobium pygmaeum, smooth spike-primrose
Epilobium saximontanum, rocky mountain willowherb
Epilobium suffruticosum, shrubby willowherb
Gaura coccinea, scarlet gaura
Gaura parviflora, velvet-leaved gaura
Gayophytum decipiens, deceptive groundsmoke
Gayophytum diffusum, diffuse groundsmoke
Gayophytum humile, low groundsmoke
Gayophytum racemosum, racemed groundsmoke
Gayophytum ramosissimum, much-branch groundsmoke
Oenothera albicaulis, prairie evening-primrose
Oenothera caespitosa, tufted evening-primrose
Oenothera elata, hooker's evening-primrose
Oenothera flava, long-tubed evening-primrose
Oenothera nuttallii, white-stemmed evening-primrose
Oenothera pallida subsp. pallida, pale evening-primrose
Oenothera perennis, small sundrops
Oenothera villosa, hairy evening-primrose

Loosestrife

Family: Lythraceae
Ammannia robusta, scarlet ammannia
Lythrum alatum, winged-loosestrife
Lythrum salicaria, purple loosestrife
Rotala ramosior, toothcup

Mezereum
Family: Thymelaeaceae
Daphne mezereum, paradise plant

Further reading

See also
 List of dicotyledons of Montana

Notes

Montana
Montana